Floozie in the Jacuzzi may refer to:

 Anna Livia (monument), a bronze sculpture located in Croppies Memorial Park in Dublin, Ireland
 The River (artwork), a sculptural fountain located in Victoria Square, Birmingham, England